Yunjaliq (also Romanized as Yūnjālīq; also known as Yūnjeh Laq and Yūnjehlīq) is a village in Chahriq Rural District, Kuhsar District, Salmas County, West Azerbaijan Province, Iran. At the 2006 census, its population was 101, in 21 families.

References 

Populated places in Salmas County